John Read FRS FRSE FCS FIC (1884–1963) was a British chemist and scientific author.

Life
He was born on 17 February 1884 at Maiden Newton in Dorset the son of John Read (1814-1889) a farmer, and his wife, Bessie Gatcombe (1854-1904). His father was 70 years old when he was born but his mother was only 30. His father died when John was five years old.

He was educated at Sparkford village school then Sexey's School in Bruton, Somerset. Around 1900 he obtained a Diploma in Science from Finsbury Technical College and won a place at the University of London studying Chemistry, graduating in 1907. He then went to Zurich as a postgraduate gaining his first doctorate (PhD).

In 1908 he began as an assistant in the Chemistry Department at Cambridge University. The university gave him a further MA in 1912. In 1916 the University of Sydney offered him the post of Professor of Organic Australia and so he emigrated to Australia. However he returned to Britain in 1923 as Professor of Chemistry at St Andrews University.

In April 1923 he visited the author Thomas Hardy.

In 1924 he was elected a Fellow of the Royal Society of Edinburgh. His proposers were Sir James Colquhoun Irvine, Sir D'Arcy Wentworth Thompson, Herbert Stanley Allen and Herbert Turnbull. He resigned in 1928.

In 1935 he was elected a Fellow of the Royal Society of London. According to his application citation his work covered: " wide and important fields, including (a) Optical activity; (b) Formation of halogenohydrins from unsaturated compounds; (c) Investigation of Australian products, including eucalyptus oils, marine fibre, Papuan petroleum; (d) Terpene chemistry". He was also credited with building and developing the Sydney organic chemistry school.

He received the Dexter Award for Outstanding Achievement in the History of Chemistry from the American Chemical Society in 1959.
He died in St Andrews on 21 January 1963

Family

In 1916 he married Ida Suddards. The ship that she rode to join him inn Australia evaded pursuit by a German submarine. They had two sons, Arthur, a mathematician and mountaineer, and Jan, a movie writer, author and photographer. A grandson, Richard Read, went on to become an American journalist.

Publications
A Textbook of Organic Chemistry (1926)
Alchemy and Alchemists (1933)
Prelude to Chemistry (1936)
Explosives (1942)
A Direct Entry to Organic Chemistry (1948)
From Alchemy to Chemistry (1957)

References

External links
 John Read (1884–1963)

1884 births
1963 deaths
People from Dorset
Academics of the University of St Andrews
Alumni of the University of London
British chemists
Fellows of the Royal Society of Edinburgh
Fellows of the Royal Society
Fellows of the Chemical Society